Barou Sanogo (born 18 April 1995) is a Malian footballer who plays as a right-back for Djoliba and the Mali national team.

International career
Diarra made his professional debut with the Mali national team in a 0–0 (5–4) 2020 African Nations Championship penalty shootout win over Guinea on 3 February 2021.

References

External links
 
 

1995 births
Living people
Malian footballers
Mali international footballers
Association football fullbacks
Djoliba AC players
Malian Première Division players
21st-century Malian people
Mali A' international footballers
2020 African Nations Championship players
2022 African Nations Championship players